The First River, in the state of New Jersey in the United States, is a subterranean river and the first main tributary of the Passaic River encountered while travelling upstream from its mouth at Newark Bay.

Beginning at the confluence of Mill Brook and Branch Brook (near the present Skating Center in Branch Brook Park), the First River flowed parallel to Seventh Avenue and Clay Street, discharging into the Passaic River in the vicinity of the Clay Street bridge.

The First River was also known as Mill Brook, having supported several mills, including grist mills for the earliest settlers of Newark in the 17th century.

The brook once flowed through, and now flows under, what is now Branch Brook Park in the city of Newark.

See also
List of rivers of New Jersey

References

Geography of Newark, New Jersey
Tributaries of the Passaic River
Rivers of New Jersey
Rivers of Essex County, New Jersey
Subterranean rivers of the United States